Lynne Ann Battaglia (born April 14, 1946) is an American lawyer and former jurist from Howard County, Maryland. From 2001 to 2016 she served as an associate judge on the Maryland Court of Appeals.

Background
Battaglia was born in Buffalo, New York. She earned a J.D. degree from the University of Maryland School of Law in 1974 and was admitted to the bar that same year. Appointed by governor Parris Glendening, since 2001 she has been an associate judge on the Maryland Court of Appeals, the state's highest appellate court.  Formerly, she served as United States Attorney for the District of Maryland and as Chief of Staff to Senator Barbara A. Mikulski.  Judge Battaglia chairs the Maryland Professionalism Commission, the Women Lawyers in Maryland project and is an associate professor at the University of Maryland and the University of Baltimore School of Law.

Judicial career

Notable opinions
McQuitty v. Spangler, 410 Md. 1 (2009) (informed consent and medical malpractice are distinct theories of negligence and an affirmative physical invasion is not a threshold requirement of an informed consent claim).
Blackwell v. Wyeth, 408 Md. 575 (2009) (when a novel scientific theory is postulated (that thiomersal in vaccines causes autism), the Frye-Reed general acceptance test applies to each phase of the scientific method; also, when an expert posits a complicated, novel scientific theory, the expert's credentials are subject to closer scrutiny as to whether the area of expertise is appropriate/relevant to the proffered theory).
Independent Newspapers v. Brodie, 407 Md. 415 (2009) (recommending a five-part test that balances the first amendment right to speak anonymously with right to discover identifying information about individuals who make defamatory remarks on the Internet).
Anderson v. Gables Condominium, 404 Md. 560 (2008) (holding that provisions of Maryland Condominium Act, generally requiring condominium council of owners to maintain property insurance on "the common elements and units, exclusive of improvements and betterments installed in units by unit owners," and requiring council to repair or replace "[a]ny portion of the condominium damaged or destroyed," do not require a council to insure, against casualty loss, property in an individual condominium unit, or to repair or replace property in an individual condominium unit after a casualty loss.)
State v. Baby, 404 Md. 220 (pronounced Ba'bee) (2008) (a woman has a right to withdraw consent to sex at any time during intercourse).
Khalifa v. Shannon, 404 Md. 107 (2008) (recognizing the tort of interference with custody and visitation rights, when mother fled to Egypt with two children never to return, and noting that loss of services was never an  element of the substantive common law tort).
Dept. of Health and Mental Hygiene v. Kelly, 397 Md. 399 (2007) (holding that Department was not authorized to forcibly medicate patient in the absence of a finding that patient was a danger to himself or others while confined at the facility.)
Clemons v. State, 392 Md. 339 (2007) (holding that conclusory aspects of the comparative bullet lead analysis were not generally accepted in the scientific community and thus, not admissible).
Rite Aid v. Levy-Gray, 391 Md. 608 (2006) (dealing with notice in products liability suit).
Newman v. State, 384 Md. 285 (2004) (Defendant may still assert attorney-client privilege to exclude evidence, even when attorney ethically disclosed the confidential information to the judge pursuant to Rule 1.6 of the Rules of Professional Conduct).
LeJune v. Coin Acceptors, 381 Md. 288 (2004) (inevitable disclosure doctrine would not be adopted as theory for finding threatened future disclosure of trade secrets)
Hemmings v. Pelham Woods, 375 Md. 522 (2003) (If apartment owner puts up security devices, they must maintain or be liable in tort).
Wholey v. Sears, 370 Md. 38 (2002) (terminating at-will employment on the grounds that the employee, as a victim or witness, gave testimony at an official proceeding or reported a suspected crime to the appropriate law enforcement or judicial officer is wrongful and contrary to public policy) (Whistleblower case).

Notable dissents
Conaway v. Deane, 401 Md. 219 (2007) (Maryland Equal Rights Amendment provides for equal protection, making statute prohibiting same-sex marriages unconstitutional).
Pringle v. State, 370 Md. 525 (2002) (Majority's holding that the police officers lacked probable cause to arrest the petitioner for possession of cocaine is based primarily upon an erroneous blending of the probable cause standard for an arrest and the sufficiency of evidence standard for a conviction), rev'd  540 U.S. 366 (agreeing with Judge Battaglia and dissent).

References

External links
Battaglia's profile at Maryland's State Archives.

1946 births
Living people
American University alumni
American women judges
Judges of the Maryland Court of Appeals
Lawyers from Buffalo, New York
United States Attorneys for the District of Maryland
University of Baltimore faculty
University of Maryland Francis King Carey School of Law alumni
Women in Maryland politics
American women academics
21st-century American women
21st-century American women judges
21st-century American judges